Football Club Mika, commonly known as Mika, was an Armenian football club from the capital Yerevan. It was owned by the Mika Corporation LLC headed by the Russia-based Armenian businessman Mikhail Baghdasarov. The club headquarters were located on Manandyan street 41, Yerevan.

History
The club was founded in 1999 as Mika-Kasakh Ashtarak in the town of Ashtarak by the owner of Mika Corporation LLC, Mikhail Baghdasarov. In 2000, they achieved their first domestic title, winning the Armenian Cup.

In 2007, Mika relocated from Ashtarak to Yerevan. They were based in their own newly built stadium in Yerevan.

However, by the end of the 2015–16 Armenian Premier League season, the club announced its retirement from professional football due to financial as well as non-financial difficulties.

Domestic history

European history 
Mika participated several times in the UEFA Cup qualification matches. Their best result was in 2007, when they advanced to the second qualifying round by defeating MTK Budapest, but did not advance further as they lost to the Slovak club Petržalka.

Stadium

Prior to its relocation from Ashtarak to Yerevan between 1999 and 2007, the Kasaghi Marzik Stadium was the home venue of the team between 2008 and 2016. FC Mika played their home games at the Mika Stadium opened in 2008 and located in the Shengavit District of Yerevan. The stadium has a capacity of 7,250.

Achievements
 Armenian Cup (6): 2000, 2001, 2003, 2005, 2006, 2011
 Armenian Supercup (2): 2005, 2012

Managers

 Rafael Galstyan (1999)
 Eduard Markarov (2000–01)
 Samvel Petrosyan (2001)
 Valeriy Gladilin (2001–02)
 Eduard Markarov (2002)
 Aramais Tonoyan (2002)
 Vagarshak Aslanyan (2002)
 Souren Barseghyan (2002–05)
 Armen Adamyan (2005–07)
 Arkady Andreasyan (2007–08)
 Ishtvan Sekech (2008)
 Souren Barseghyan (2008–09)
 Ivo Šušak (1 Jan 2009 – 30 June 2009)
 Samvel Darbinyan (1 July 2009 – 30 June 2010)
 Armen Adamyan (2009–10)
 Armen Shahgeldyan (2010–11)
 Jozef Bubenko (19 July 2011 – 1 Dec 2011)
 Zsolt Hornyák (1 March 2012 – 30 June 2013)
 Aram Voskanyan (1 July 2013 – 30 June 2015)
 Armen Adamyan (1 July 2015 – 18 January 2016)
 Sergei Yuran (19 January 2016 – 4 May 2016)
 Armen Shahgeldyan (5 May 2016 – )

References

 
Mika
Defunct football clubs in Armenia
Association football clubs established in 1999
Mika
1999 establishments in Armenia